Ranggong Daeng Romo is  a National Hero of Indonesia.

References

National Heroes of Indonesia
1915 births
1947 deaths